Mauritius competed its eighth consecutive Olympiad at the 2012 Summer Olympics in London, from 27 July to 12 August 2012.

This Olympiad had a contingent of 11 athletes, 4 men and 7 women, to represent the nation in 7 different sports. Mauritius distinctions of this Olympiad were : the repeat of sending more female than male athletes, the nation's debut at Olympic triathlon and beach volleyball, and breaking its medals streak started at the 2004 Summer Olympics. Beach volleyballer Natacha Rigobert was the eldest team member at 32 and was honored as their inaugural female flag bearer at an opening ceremony.

Athletics

Men

Women

Boxing

Mauritius has qualified boxers for the following events.
Men

Cycling

Road

Judo

Swimming

Mauritius has gained two "Universality places" from the FINA.

Men

Women

Triathlon

Mauritius has qualified the following athletes.

Volleyball

Beach

References

External links
 
 

Nations at the 2012 Summer Olympics
2012
Olym